Méndez Álvaro is a Madrid Metro, Cercanías and international bus station in Madrid city center. It was opened on 7 May 1981 and is near Atocha railway station in fare Zone A.

References

Line 6 (Madrid Metro) stations
1981 establishments in Spain
Railway stations in Spain opened in 1981
Cercanías Madrid stations
Railway stations in Spain opened in 1979